This is a list of public art in the London Borough of Newham.

Bromley-by-Bow

Canning Town

Custom House

East Ham

Forest Gate

Manor Park

North Woolwich and Silvertown

Plaistow

Royal Docks

Stratford

Three Mills

Upton Park

West Ham

References

Bibliography

External links
 

Public art
Newham
Public art